Captain Calamity is a 1936 American South Seas adventure film directed by John Reinhardt and starring George Houston released by Grand National Pictures. It was filmed in an early colour process called Hirlicolor at Talisman Studios and Santa Catalina Island, California.

Plot
A penniless ship's captain is taking a passenger ashore after their voyage.  The passenger throws a gold coin in the ocean that he says has been bad luck to him as it was a gift from his ex-fiancee. The Captain sends one of his men, an experienced underwater diver, to successfully retrieve it.  The passenger explains that is a gold Spanish doubloon and the Captain is more than welcome to it.

Going ashore, the Captain decides to have some fun by telling stories indicating that he discovered four chests full of the coins, which were pirate treasure.  The news spreads throughout the island and leads to kidnapping, torture, murder and an attack on the Captain's ship.

Cast 
 George Houston as Captain Bill Jones / Captain Calamity
 Marian Nixon as Madge Lewis
 Vince Barnett as Burp
 Juan Torena as Mike
 Movita as Annana
 Crane Wilbur as Dr. James Kelkey
 George J. Lewis as Black Pierre (as George Lewis)
 Roy D'Arcy as Samson
 Margaret Irving as Mamie Gruen
 Barry Norton as Carr
 Louis Natheaux as E.D. Joblin - Store Owner
 Lloyd Ingraham as Trader Jim
 Alberto Gandero as Gandero - a Sailor (as Albert Gandero)
 Harold Howard as Guy Warren
 Charles Moyer as Mac' McKenzie - a Sailor

Gordon Jones, Maria Kalamo and John Van Pelt appear uncredited. The pig that appeared in the film was barbecued and served to the cast.

Soundtrack 
 George Houston - "Riders of the Rolling Seas" (Written by Jack Stern and Harry Tobias)
 George Houston - "A Drunken Sailor" (Written by Jack Stern and Harry Tobias)
 George Houston - "Tell Me Why" (Written by Jack Stern and Harry Tobias)
 George Houston - "Drop Your Anchor" (Written by Jack Stern and Harry Tobias)

Spanish version
A Spanish-language version, El capitan Tormenta was filmed alongside Captain Calamity. Roy D'Arcy Juan Torena, Barry Norton and Movita reprised their roles (though most of the character names were changed). Fortunio Bonanova replaced Huston in the title role and Lupita Tovar served as Nixon's Spanish-language alternative, renamed Magda. Supposedly, producer Hirliman had wanted Tovar to play the female lead in both productions, but she only appeared in the Spanish version.

Notes

External links 
 
 

1936 films
1930s color films
1936 adventure films
American adventure films
Films directed by John Reinhardt
Grand National Films films
Films set in Oceania
Cinecolor films
Seafaring films
Treasure hunt films
American multilingual films
1936 multilingual films
1930s English-language films
1930s American films